Muadamiyat al-Qalamoun is a Syrian town in the Al-Qutayfah District of the Rif Dimashq Governorate. According to the Syria Central Bureau of Statistics (CBS), Muadamiyat al-Qalamoun had a population of 14,228 in the 2004 census. Its inhabitants are predominantly Sunni Muslims.

References

Bibliography

Populated places in Al-Qutayfah District
Towns in Syria